Guy Scheiman  is an Israeli DJ, remixer and music producer known for his official remixes and productions. He has performed as DJ in several club appearances  and notable international events across the globe.

In 2015, Scheiman founded his own record label named Guy Scheiman Music. He has collaborated with Inaya Day, Katherine Ellis, Amuka, and other notable Diva singers. He also collaborated with notable DJs and musicians such as Tony Moran, Nina Flowers, and was a part of Bent Collective.

In 2020, Scheiman was nominated for the 18th Annual Independent Music Awards.

Discography

Albums

Notable Releases

Notable Remixes

See also 
 What About Us (The Saturdays song)
 Gimme! Gimme! Gimme! (A Man After Midnight)
 Trenyce
 What Now (song)
 I Was Gonna Cancel

References

Living people
Israeli musicians
Israeli DJs
Israeli record producers
Remixers
Musicians from Tel Aviv

Year of birth missing (living people)